Network Control Protocol might refer to:

 Network Control Protocol (ARPANET), the initial ARPANET network protocol
 Network Control Protocol is part of the Point-to-Point Protocol

See also
 Network Control Program (ARPANET), the software which implements the Network Control Protocol of the ARPANET